The Mackinaw Historic District is a historic residential area located on the western side of the Great Miami River in Franklin, Ohio. The historic district was added to the National Register of Historic Places in 1980. The area features homes built between 1825 and 1925 spanning numerous architectural styles, including Queen Anne and other Victorian styles. The most notable building is the Harding House (now Harding Museum), a Colonial Revival mansion in the heart of the district.

See also
List of Registered Historic Places in Warren County, Ohio

References

Houses on the National Register of Historic Places in Ohio
Queen Anne architecture in Ohio
Victorian architecture in Ohio
National Register of Historic Places in Warren County, Ohio
Houses in Warren County, Ohio
Historic districts on the National Register of Historic Places in Ohio